All the Great Hits is a compilation album by the Commodores, released in 1982 by Motown Records. It consisted of Commodores hit singles, including the number-one hits "Three Times a Lady" and "Still", along with two new songs, "Painted Picture" and "Reach High". The record was certified RIAA gold on May 8, 1985, for selling over 500,000 copies.

Track listing 
Side one
 "Painted Picture" – 4:55
 "Lady (You Bring Me Up)" – 4:01
 "Sail On" – 3:58
 "Still" – 3:43
 "Machine Gun" – 2:41

Side two
 "Brick House" – 3:26
 "Easy" – 4:15
 "Oh No" – 3:00
 "Three Times a Lady" – 3:35
 "Reach High" – 3:35

Production 
Commodores – writing, producer, arrangements
James Anthony Carmichael – producer, arrangements
Calvin Harris, Jane Clark – recording/mixing engineer
Michael Johnson, Phil Brown, Richard Wells – assistant engineer
John Matousek – mastering engineer
Paulinho da Costa – percussion on "Painted Picture"
Johnny Lee – art direction
Ron Slenzak – photography
Suzee Wendy Ikeda – project manager

References 

Commodores albums
1982 compilation albums
Motown compilation albums